The Nieuport-Delage NiD.29 was a French single-seat biplane fighter (C.I category)  designed and built by Nieuport-Delage for the French Air Force.

Design and development

The prototype NiD.29 was an equal-span biplane with ailerons on both upper and lower wings. It had a fixed tailskid landing gear, a nose-mounted engine and a single open cockpit for the pilot. The prototype NiD 29 was evaluated by the French Service Aeronautique de l'Armee in July 1918 and a pre-production batch was ordered on 21 August 1918. It was powered by a  Hispano-Suiza 8Fb piston engine, it performed well in test but could not achieve the required ceiling. The second prototype was modified with an increased wingspan and on exceeding the required ceiling it was ordered into production in 1920, becoming the fastest service fighter in the world at that time. Production aircraft did not have ailerons on the upper wing and the lower wing ailerons were increased in span, but reduced in chord.

The first mass production deliveries were made in 1922 to the French Air Force and the type was popular although it did have a tendency to enter a flat spin. The French military bought 250 aircraft which were built by Nieuport and seven other companies. The NiD 29 was to become an important fighter in the 1920s with purchases of 30 by Spain (including 10 Spanish licence built aircraft), 108 by Belgium (87 licensed built by SABCA). The Italian Regia Aeronautica bought 175 aircraft including 95 built by Macchi as the Macchi-Nieuport 29 and 80 built by Caproni. Sweden bought nine aircraft and designated them J 2. The Japanese company Nakajima bought a pattern aircraft and built 608 for the Imperial Japanese Army as the Ko-4.

Racing versions of the aircraft were developed and they gained eight world speed records and won the 1920 Gordon Bennett Trophy and the 1922 Coupe Deutsch de la Meurthe competition.

Operational history
Three NiD 29s were modified for reserve Captain Joseph Sadi-Lecointe in November 1925 and used on seventy sorties against insurgents in Morocco using bomb racks with six 10 kg bombs. Spanish aircraft were also involved in similar operations in North Africa.

Variants
Nieuport Ni.29Prototype for series, powered by a  Hispano-Suiza 8Fb engine.
NiD.29 C.1
Production aircraft, powered by  Hispano-Suiza 8Fb engines.
NiD.29 B.1

Small number of conversions as an experimental assault version to carry six  bombs.
NiD.29bis
Prototype only with reduced wing area and steerable tailskid, powered by a  Hispano-Suiza 8Fb engine.
NiD.29G
Prototypes fitted with a Gnome Monosoupape 9N rotary engine, two later converted to take a Hispano engine and fitted with twin floats and an auxiliary tail float for the Grand Prix de Monaco in 1923.
NiD.29M
Single prototype for Aeronavale (M for Marine) similar to 29G but with  Le Rhone 9R, further converted into 32Rh.
NiD.29D
Conversion with an engine driven supercharger for an attempt on the altitude record, reached .
NiD.29 ET.1
Trainer variant with a  Hispano-Suiza 8Ab engine and a single synchronised Vickers machine-gun, three built.
NiD.29 SHV

Seaplane for the 1919 Schneider Trophy contest with reduced wingspan and military equipment removed, two aircraft built and one was also entered in the 1921 event but neither aircraft flew in the races. Powered by a  Hispano-Suiza 8Fb engine
NiD.29V
Lightweight racer developed in 1919 with a wingspan reduced to 6.00m (19ft 8¼in), powered by a  Hispano-Suiza 8Fb engine, three built.
NiD.29Vbis
One-off conversion with an enclosed cockpit to gain more speed, the pilot had small teardrop windows on each side with little forward visibility. Powered by a Hispano-Suiza 8Fb engine boosted to give . The aircraft was lost in a landing accident in 1921. 
NiD.32Rh
 Le Rhone rotary powered derivative for use by the French Navy as a carrier fighter. Ten built including one converted from 29M.
NiD.33 E.2
Two-seat trainer with conventional square-section fabric-covered fuselage. Small numbers used by Japan.  
NiD.40 C.1
High altitude fighter with Rateau turbocharger
NiD.40R
One-off modification of NiD.40 C.1 with extended wings and new tail for high-altitude record flights. Later fitted with floats.
Nakajima 甲 4 (Ko 4)
Japanese licence-built NiD.29, 608 built.

Operators

Argentine Army Aviation operated 6 examples from 1925 assigned to the 3rd Observation Group.

Belgian Air Force operated 108 examples of which 88 were built locally by SABCA from 1922 until replaced by Avia BH-21s from 1927 and Fairey Firefly IIM in 1931 

Kwangsi operated 12 examples purchased from Japan from 1935
Manchuria operated 4 examples purchased from a Japanese mission in 1931

French Air Force operated over 600 from 1922
French Navy operated a small number before standardizing on the Dewoitine D.1

Corpo Aeronautico Militare operated 175 examples built by Macchi and Caproni from 1924 until at least 1931. These were flown by the 76, 84, 91st Squadriglias of the 7th Gruppo, 70, 74 and 75th Squadriglias of the 23rd Gruppo of the 1st Stormo Caccia and the 92nd Squadriglia 8th Gruppo.

Imperial Japanese Army operated 608 Nakajima-built Ko.4 (Nieuport Fighter type 4) from 1923 until 1937 or later in the 1, 3, 4, 7 and 8 Hiko Rentai (Air Regiments). One pattern aircraft was purchased from France

Spanish Air Force operated 30 examples from 1923 until replaced with Nieuport-Delage NiD 52s in 1931

Manchukuo Air Force operated a single ex-Manchurian and ex-Japanese Ko 4 when formed in 1937.

Swedish Air Force operated 10 examples designated as Jaktflygplan 2 (Fighter Type 2) from 1925 by Flygflottilj F.3 (3rd Wing) and F.5.
 Siam/Thailand
Royal Siamese Air Service and Royal Thai Air Force operated 52 as บ.ข.๔ (B.Kh4 or fighter type 4) from 1923, 40 of which were built in Siam. Some examples remained in service after the country became Thailand.

Survivor

A single example survives at the Musée de l'Air et de l'Espace in Paris although it is not presently on display.

Specifications (NiD 29)

See also

References

Notes

Bibliography
 Andersson, Lennart. A History of Chinese Aviation:Encyclopedia of Aircraft and Aviation in China until 1949. Taipei, Taiwan: AHS of ROC, 2008. .

 Illustrated Encyclopedia of Aircraft (Part Work 1982-1985). London: Orbis Publishing, 1985.

 Taylor, John W. R. and Jean Alexander. Combat Aircraft of the World. New York: G.P. Putnam's Sons, 1969. .
 Taylor, Michael J. H. Jane's Encyclopedia of Aviation. London: Studio Editions, 1989. .
 
 

1910s French fighter aircraft
 029
Biplanes
Single-engined tractor aircraft
Aircraft first flown in 1918